Astana-Baba is a village in the Kerki District of the Lebap Province of Turkmenistan. It is about 12 km northwest of Kerki.

Etymology 
Astana, in Farsi, means mausoleum.

History 
The site was first studied by Russian orientalist Boris Litvinov in the fall of 1899. It was further studied by Galina Pugachenkova and Mikhail Masson.

Sites

Alamberdar Mausoleum 
Some historians believe the structure to have been commissioned by Mahmud of Ghazni in memory of his ally (and Samanid ruler) Isma'il Muntasir; others attribute Muntasir himself. A square structure, three of its walls have blind niches; the brickwork is intensely decorative — Paul Brummell noted it to be among the finest examples of 11th c. Turkmen architecture. That the mausoleum did not become a shrine indicates that no saint was buried; it might have been a person from the secular spheres or none at all. In Turkmen tradition, an eponymous commander of Ali was buried at the site.

Astana Baba Mausoleum 
The complex — primarily, a set of four domed rooms — has been progressively expanded over the centuries. The entrance portal leads into a hall, before two successive pairs of domed rooms: the first pair is believed to be the oldest constructions, and contain a tomb and mosque. Beyond, comes the second pair constructed c. 19th century, containing two tombs each and known as the Kizlyar-Bibi Mausoleum. Identities of all the buried people remain unknown; local tradition asserts Ibn Ali Nur, a local ruler of Balkh, to have constructed the mausoleum for his daughter.

Notes

References 

Populated places in Lebap Region